The Level Mountain Range is a small but prominent mountain range occupying the broad summit of Level Mountain in northern British Columbia, Canada. Located between the Tuya River in the east and the Sheslay River in the west, it represents a high point on the Nahlin Plateau. The range is geologically younger than the main mass of Level Mountain, having formed in the last 7.1 million years. An eroded stratovolcano and several lava domes of Miocene-to-Pleistocene age comprise the Level Mountain Range.

See also
List of volcanoes in Canada

References

Level Mountain
Mountain ranges of British Columbia
Stratovolcanoes of Canada
Miocene stratovolcanoes
Pliocene lava domes
Pleistocene volcanoes
Cassiar Country